Bellerofonte Castaldi (1580 –  27 September 1649) was an Italian composer, poet and lutenist.

Castaldi was born in Collegara, near Modena. He wrote male parts in his songs for tenors as he was opposed to the practice of castrati or male falsettists singing male parts in cantatas. In the preface to his collection, Primo mazzetto he writes that it is "laughable that a man with the voice of a woman should set about proposing to his mistress".

He died in Modena in 1649.

Works, editions and recordings
 Primo mazzetto di fiori musicalmente colti dal giardino bellerofonteo - monodies, duets, and trios, with basso continuo (Venice, 1623).

Editions
 Capricci a 2 stromenti cioè tiorba e tiorbino e per sonar solo varie sorti di balli e fantasticarie (1622). Edited by David Dolata, as Capricci (1622), 2 vols. Recent Researches in the Music of the Baroque Era 142 & 143. Part 1: Duos for Theorbo and Tiorbino; Sonatas for Theorbo. Part 2: Dances and Other Works for Theorbo; Songs with Tablature Accompaniment. Middleton, Wisc.: A-R Editions, 2006.  (vol. 1),  (vol. 2)

Recordings
 Battaglia d'amore. Castaldi's settings of his own poetry. CD. Gian Paolo Fagotto (tenor). David Dolata, lute. Victor Coelho, lute. Neil Cockburn, harpsichord. Il-Furioso. Toccata Classics

References

Musicians from Modena
Italian Baroque composers
Composers for lute
Italian male classical composers
1580s births
1649 deaths
17th-century Italian composers
17th-century male musicians